Honorary Fellows of Balliol College, Oxford.

 Sir George Alberti
 Sir Eric Anderson
 Eric Lubbock, 4th Baron Avebury
 Hagan Bayley
 Ronnie Bell
 Maxine Berg
 Rajeev Bhargava
 Ewan Birney
 Sir Drummond Bone
 Glen Bowersock
 Sir Henry Brooke
 John Carey
 Amit Chaudhuri
 Richard Cobb
 Gavyn Davies
 Richard Dawkins
 Dame Cressida Dick
 Sir Peter Donnelly
 Bill Drayton
 James Fairfax
 Stephanie Flanders
 Sir Simon Fraser
 Peter Geach
 Andrew Graham
 Clare Grey
 Harald V of Norway
 Denis Healey, Baron Healey
 Robert Hinde
 Nicola Horlick
 Brian Hutton, Baron Hutton
 Charlotte Jones
 Sir John Keegan
 Sir David Keene
 Sir Anthony Kenny
 Sir Nicholas Kenyon
 Sir Anthony Leggatt
 Gwyneth Lewis
 Sir Colin Lucas
 Empress Masako
 Sir Neil MacCormick
 Ved Mehta
 Cheryl Misak
 Edward Mortimer
 Nada Al-Nashif
 Deepak Nayyar
 George Nicholl
 Loyiso Nongxa
 Chris Patten, Baron Patten
 Sir Nicholas Penny
 Richard Portes
 Graham Richards
 Sir Christopher Ricks
 Ivan Roitt
 Lyndal Roper
 Alan Ryan
 Paul Sarbanes
 Kurt Schmoke
 Sir Nigel Sheinwald
 Paul Slack
 Oliver Smithies
 Peter Snow
 George Steiner
 Sir Simon Stevens
 Gilbert Strang
 Paul Streeten
 Charles Taylor
 Sir Keith Thomas
 Sarah Thomas
 Richard von Weizsäcker
 Sir Stanley Wells
 Martin Litchfield West
 Timothy Williamson
 Michael Winterbottom

Honorary
Balliol